Sinéad C. Russell (born June 15, 1993) is a Canadian competition swimmer from Burlington, Ontario who swam for the Oakville Dolphins swim club in Oakville, Ontario. In March 2012, Russell competed at the 2012 Canadian Olympic swim trials in Montreal, where she qualified for two events, the 100 metre backstroke and the 200 metre backstroke. At the 2012 Summer Olympics in the women's 100-metre backstroke, Russell finished in 13th place in the heats and qualified for the semifinals, but did not secure a place in the finals. In the 200-metre backstroke heats, Russell touched the wall third in her heat and advanced to the semifinals. In the semifinals, Russell was in first position after the first length, touching the wall before eventual gold medal winner Missy Franklin but lost speed and touched the wall third with a time of 2:08.76, which was still enough to qualify her for the 8th and final spot in the final.  In the final, Russell finished 8th with a time of 2:09.86.

Currently, Russell attends the University of Florida on an athletic scholarship, and swam for coach Gregg Troy's Florida Gators swimming and diving team in National Collegiate Athletic Association (NCAA) and Southeastern Conference (SEC) competition in 2013 and 2014, while continuing to swim at the international level with Swim Canada.  During her freshman and sophomore seasons as a Gator, she received fourteen All-American honours, the most an American college swimmer may receive in two years.  Russell was sidelined with a blood clot in her brain in mid-January 2015, but hopes to return to competitive swimming as her health situation is resolved.

She is the younger sister of Colin Russell, another Canadian swimmer who competed in the 2008 and 2012 Olympics.

See also

 List of University of Florida alumni
 List of University of Florida Olympians
 List of Commonwealth Games medallists in swimming (women)

References

External links 

  Sinead Russell – Olympic athlete profile at Sports-Reference.com

1993 births
Living people
Canadian female backstroke swimmers
Florida Gators women's swimmers
Olympic swimmers of Canada
Sportspeople from Oshawa
Swimmers at the 2012 Summer Olympics
Swimmers at the 2014 Commonwealth Games
Commonwealth Games bronze medallists for Canada
Commonwealth Games medallists in swimming
Medallists at the 2014 Commonwealth Games